Boissy-l'Aillerie is a commune in the Val-d'Oise department in Île-de-France in northern France.

Pontoise – Cormeilles Aerodrome is located in the commune. At one time Aigle Azur's head office was on the grounds of the airport.

Geography

Climate

Boissy-l'Aillerie has a oceanic climate (Köppen climate classification Cfb).

Education
, the communal preschool (maternelle) had 65 students and the communal elementary school had 128 students.

See also

Communes of the Val-d'Oise department

References

External links
Official website 
Official website  (Archive)

Association of Mayors of the Val d'Oise 

Communes of Val-d'Oise